Daniel McAlpine (21 January 1849 – 12 October 1932) was a Scottish-born Australian mycologist known for his research in plant pathology. He wrote several publications on plant disease in many crops and other plants. McAlpine was a lecturer in biology at the University of Melbourne from 1884, and, with his appointment to the Victorian Department of Agriculture from 1890 to 1911, became the British Empire's first professional plant pathologist.

Early life

He was born in Saltcoats,  Scotland, the third son of schoolmaster Daniel McAlpine and his wife Flora. The young Daniel attended Ardeer School, where his father taught. McAlpine graduated from the University of London in 1873, where he attended lectures given by such luminaries as Thomas Henry Huxley (biology), William Turner Thiselton-Dyer (botany), Archibald Geikie (geology), and Robert Etheridge (paleontology). McAlpine was later appointed professor of natural history at the New Veterinary College in Edinburgh, and then lecturer in biology and botany at the Heriot-Watt College.

McAlpine moved to Melbourne, Australia in 1884, six years after his marriage to Isabella Jamieson Williamson. They would eventually have five daughters together. He was appointed to a lectureship in biology at Ormond College, University of Melbourne in 1885. A year later, he became visiting lecturer in botany at the Melbourne College of Pharmacy, a position he held until 1911. McAlpine was appointed to the Victorian Department of Agriculture as a vegetable pathologist. This appointment was made by Alfred Deakin, later the Prime Minister of Australia. He was succeeded in this position in 1913 by Charles Clifton Brittlebank, his assistant from 1908. Brittlebank provided illustrations for several of McAlpine's publications.

McAlpine regularly corresponded with geologist Sir Archibald Geikie, and occasionally with his younger brother James Geikie. McAlpine had a long friendship with David Orme Masson, Professor of Chemistry at the University of Melbourne known for his work on the explosive compound nitroglycerine.

McAlpine died in Leitchville on 12 October 1932.

Career

As vegetable pathologist, McAlpine was tasked with determining the cause of bitter pit, a once economically devastating fungal disease of apples in Australia. Despite his failure, it took another four decades for the necessary scientific knowledge to be developed. He did confirm that neither infectious agents nor poisons were the cause of bitter pit.

Memberships and honors

McAlpine was an honorary member of the Caesarian Leopold-Caroline Academy of Natural Phenomena (1894). He was a corresponding member of the Linnean Society of New South Wales (1902). In 1971 the Australasian Plant Pathology Society started the McAlpine memorial lectures. The first lecture was given by Lilian Fraser at the 2nd National Conference held in Brisbane 12–14 May 1976, was titled "Diseases of Citrus Trees in Australia - the First Hundred Years". The Department of Environment and Primary Industries (Victoria) awards the "Daniel McAlpine Science Award". McAlpine has been called "the greatest figure in Victorian mycology".

Fungus species named in his honour include Amanitopsis mcalpineana , and Hydnangium mcalpinei .

Selected publications

In 30 years of research, McAlpine published over 200 papers, monographs, and books dealing with all aspects of the plant pathology, from disease control methods to taxonomic studies of rusts, smuts and other fungi and from field diseases of cereals, citrus, grapes and stone fruit to post-harvest disorders of apples and other produce.

See also
List of mycologists
:Category:Taxa named by Daniel McAlpine

References

Cited literature
Parbery, Douglas George (2015). Daniel McAlpine and the Bitter Pit. Australian Plant Pathology ISBN 9783319095516.

Further reading
Ainsworth, G.C. Brief Biographies of British Mycologists p. 113, 1996
Australasian Journal of Pharmacy for October and November 1932 (n.s. XIII, pp. 933 and 1037)

1849 births
1932 deaths
Academics of Heriot-Watt University
Alumni of the University of London
People from Saltcoats
Scottish mycologists